Izmail Raion is a raion (administrative division) in Odesa Oblast in southwestern Ukraine.  Its administrative center is the town of Izmail. It is in the historical region of Budjak in southern Bessarabia. Population: 

On 18 July 2020, as part of the administrative reform of Ukraine, the number of raions of Odesa Oblast was reduced to seven, and the area of Izmail Raion was significantly expanded.  The January 2020 estimate of the raion population was 

In the 2001 Ukrainian Census, the raion had a multi-ethnic population of 54,692. 29% were Ukrainians, 28% Moldovans, 26%  Bessarabian Bulgarians and 16% Russians.

Administrative division

Current
After the reform in July 2020, the raion consisted of 6 hromadas:
 Izmail urban hromada with the administration in the city of Izmail, transferred from the city of oblast significance of Izmai; 
 Kiliia urban hromada
 Reni urban hromada
 Safiany rural hromada with the administration in the selo of Safiany, retained from Izmail Raion;
 Suvorove settlement hromada with the administration in the urban-type settlement of Suvorove, retained from Izmail Raion;
 Vylkove urban hromada

Before 2020

Before the 2020 reform, the raion consisted of two hromadas, 
 Safiany rural hromada with the administration in Safiany;
 Suvorove settlement hromada with the administration in Suvorove.

See also
Izmail Oblast

References

External links
  Izmailsky Raion
  Izmailsky Raion

 
Raions of Odesa Oblast
Bulgarian communities in Ukraine
Romanian communities in Ukraine
1959 establishments in Ukraine